Paws and Whiskers is a 2014 fundraising anthology for the Battersea Dogs and Cats Home, featuring some of the best children's stories about cats and dogs of all time, selected by multi-award-winning and best-selling children's author Jacqueline Wilson, with illustrations by Nick Sharratt. Published 13 February 2014 by Doubleday Children's, the book includes a new story by Wilson, Leonie's Pet Cat, as well as extracts from such classics as The Hundred and One Dalmatians, by Dodie Smith, and Through the Looking Glass by Lewis Carroll.

Also called Battersea Cats and Dogs Anthology before publication, the book is under licence from "Battersea Dogs' Home Ltd.", with royalties from book sales going to support the registered charity. Although dogs appear before cats in the name of this animal welfare organisation, the anthology has the section with excerpts from Cat Stories first, and Dog Stories last, with the special Pets' Corner section in the middle, featuring new stories by notable children's authors about their pets.

The cover art includes illustrations of pets. "That's Shanti on the cover, in the bottom right hand corner", said Francesca Simon, who wrote the story about her Tibetan Spaniel.

Extracts from the book
Catwings by Ursula K. Le Guin
The Daydreamer by Ian McEwan
Ice Lolly by Jean Ure
The Theatre Cat by Noel Streatfeild
Through the Looking Glass by Lewis Carroll
Gobbolino the Witch's Cat by Ursula Moray Williams
The Cat that Walked by Himself by Rudyard Kipling
Orlando's Invisible Pyjamas by Kathleen Hale
Soffrona and Her Cat Muff by Mary Martha Sherwood
Varjak Paw by S. F. Said
The Diary of a Killer Cat by Anne Fine
The Incredible Journey by Sheila Burnford
Osbert by Noel Streatfeild
A Dog So Small by Philippa Pearce
The Accidental Tourist by Anne Tyler
Love That Dog by Sharon Creech
The Hundred and One Dalmatians by Dodie Smith
Just William by Richmal Crompton
Born to Run by Michael Morpurgo
David Copperfield by Charles Dickens
Shadow, the Sheep-Dog by Enid Blyton
The Knife of Never Letting Go by Patrick Ness
Because of Winn-Dixie by Kate DiCamillo
The Werepuppy by Jacqueline Wilson

Pets' Corner

The "Pets' Corner" section of the book is where famous authors (such as Horrid Henry's Francesca Simon and The Magic Faraway Tree's Enid Blyton) talk about their pets.

Views and Comments
CBBC has done a book club report on it by Katie Thistleton, citing part of it as a "brilliant read". People have been allowed to comment on the book report and so far there has been over 300 comments. In The Guardian newspaper review, Kat Winter has given it an 8.5 out of ten, commenting on the fact the stories were too short, she wanted to find out more.

Charity
For every copy of Paws and Whiskers sold, a small amount will go to the Battersea Dogs and Cats Home. It is also the place Jacqueline got her cats, Jacob and Lily. Battersea Dogs and Cats is an animal charity who specialise in abandoned cats and dogs and look for foster, or permanent, owners. They also tour around different schools, showing them about animals. They also arrived at the book signing event for Paws and Whiskers.

See also

Dogs Trust
RSPCA
Blue Cross

References

External links
Jacqueline Wilson Official Site (www.jacquelinewilson.co.uk)
Paws and Whiskers by Jacqueline Wilson | The Times (www.thetimes.co.uk)
BBC CBBC Book Club Review

Children's short story collections
British writers
2014 children's books
Doubleday (publisher) books
Works by Jacqueline Wilson
Fiction anthologies
Books about cats
Books about dogs